Gerry Sharpe may refer to:
 Gerry Sharpe (photographer)
 Gerry Sharpe (footballer)